Callichroma is a genus of beetles in the family Cerambycidae, containing the following species:

 Callichroma atroviride Schmidt, 1924
 Callichroma auricomum (Linnaeus, 1767)
 Callichroma batesi Gahan, 1894
 Callichroma cosmicum White, 1853
 Callichroma cyanomelas White, 1853
 Callichroma distinguendum Gounelle, 1911
 Callichroma euthalia Bates, 1879
 Callichroma gounellei Achard, 1910
 Callichroma holochlorum Bates, 1872
 Callichroma iris Taschenberg, 1870
 Callichroma magnificum Napp & Martins, 2009
 Callichroma minimum Podany, 1965
 Callichroma omissum Schmidt, 1924
 Callichroma onorei Giesbert, 1998
 Callichroma seiunctum Schmidt, 1924
 Callichroma sericeum (Fabricius, 1792)
 Callichroma velutinum (Fabricius, 1775)
 Callichroma viridipes Bates, 1879

References

External links
 

Callichromatini
Cerambycidae genera